Bronágh Taggart is an Irish actress and writer, born in Belfast. She has appeared in BAFTA-winning Occupation, Best: His Mother's Son, and The Fall and has written for BBC Northern Ireland series 6Degrees since it first aired in 2012.  In 2013, she wrote a half-hour film, Call it a Night, for broadcast on Channel 4 as part of the late-night Coming Up series.

In 2017, Taggart wrote, produced and starred in Guard, a female-led boxing film directed by Jonathan Harden. It had its debut at the Oscar-qualifying Galway Film Fleadh in July 2017, and soon after its North American premiere at the Oscar and BAFTA-qualifying Rhode Island International Film Festival.

She has been married to actor Jonathan Harden, since 2008.

Television

Films

References

External links
 

Living people
Film actresses from Northern Ireland
Television actresses from Northern Ireland
21st-century actresses from Northern Ireland
1981 births
Stage actresses from Northern Ireland
People from County Antrim
Actresses from Belfast
Alumni of Queen's University Belfast
British screenwriters
Screenwriters from Northern Ireland
Television writers from Northern Ireland
British women screenwriters
British women television writers